John Henry Dunn (November 1888 – 1968) was an English professional footballer who played as a full back in the Football League for The Wednesday.

Personal life 
On 16 November 1914, four months since Britain's entry into the First World War, Dunn enlisted in the Football Battalion of the Middlesex Regiment. In November 1915, he was transferred to the regiment's 27th (Depot) Battalion and was released from the army in March 1916 to work in a munitions factory in Liverpool.

Honours 
Eccles Borough
 Lancashire Combination First Division: 1912–13

Career statistics

References

1888 births
1968 deaths
People from Eccles, Greater Manchester
English footballers
English Football League players
Association football inside forwards
Eccles United F.C. players
Leeds City F.C. players
British Army personnel of World War I
Middlesex Regiment soldiers
Southern Football League players
Luton Town F.C. players
Leeds City F.C. wartime guest players
Everton F.C. wartime guest players
Blackpool F.C. wartime guest players
Sheffield Wednesday F.C. players
Date of birth unknown
Date of death unknown